La Notte is a 1961 drama film directed by Michelangelo Antonioni and starring Marcello Mastroianni, Jeanne Moreau and Monica Vitti (with Umberto Eco appearing in a cameo). Filmed on location in Milan, the film depicts a single day and night in the lives of a disillusioned novelist (Mastroianni) and his alienated wife (Moreau) as they move through various social circles. The film continues Antonioni's tradition of abandoning traditional storytelling in favor of visual composition, atmosphere, and mood.

Grossing 470 million lire and receiving acclaim for its exploration of modernist themes of isolation, La Notte received the Golden Bear at the Berlin International Film Festival (first time for Italian film), as well as the David di Donatello Award for Best Director in 1961. La Notte is considered the central film of a trilogy beginning with L'Avventura (1960) and ending with L'Eclisse (1962). It was one of Stanley Kubrick's 10 favorite films and received 4 votes from critics and 6 votes from directors in the 2012 Sight & Sound greatest films poll.

Plot 
Giovanni Pontano (Marcello Mastroianni), a distinguished writer and his beautiful wife Lidia (Jeanne Moreau), visit their dying friend Tommaso Garani (Bernhard Wicki) in a hospital in Milan. Giovanni's new book, La stagione (The Season), has just been published and Tommaso praises his friend's work. They drink champagne but Tommaso is unable to hide his severe pain. Shaken by the sight of her dying friend, Lidia leaves saying she'll visit tomorrow. Giovanni stays behind and as he leaves his friend's room, a sick and uninhibited young woman attempts to seduce him, and he goes into her room and reciprocates. They are interrupted by the nurses. Outside the hospital, Giovanni sees his wife crying but does not comfort her. As they drive off, he tells her about his "unpleasant" encounter with the sick woman and is surprised when Lidia is not fooled and dismisses the incident as his responsibility. 

They drive to a party celebrating Giovanni's new book, which has been well received. Giovanni signs books, while his wife looks on from a distance. After a while Lidia leaves. She wanders the streets of Milan, ending up in the neighborhood where she and Giovanni lived as newlyweds. She comes across a brutal street fight which she tries to stop and later she watches rockets being set off in a field. Back at the apartment, Giovanni finally hears from Lidia and he picks her up from the old neighborhood, which seems to have little sentimental value for him. She bathes, but he makes no move on her. Later they decide to go to a nightclub, where they watch a mesmerizing and seductive performance by a female dancer and engage in small talk. "I no longer have inspirations, only recollections", Giovanni tells his wife. Lidia suggests they leave the club and attend a swanky party thrown by a millionaire businessman. "One must do something", she says.

At the party, Giovanni socializes with the guests and appears to be in his element, while Lidia walks around in a state of boredom. They spend some time with the host, Mr. Gherardini (Vincenzo Corbella). Giovanni wanders off and meets Valentina Gherardini (Monica Vitti), the host's lively, charming daughter. As they flirt, she teaches him a game she just invented, sliding a compact across the floor to try to land on certain of the floor's large checkerboard squares, and soon others gather to watch their competition. Later they see each other alone and Giovanni makes a pass at her, kissing her while Lidia looks on from the floor above.

Later Mr. Gherardini meets privately with Giovanni and offers him an executive position with his company, to write the firm's history. Giovanni is reluctant to accept and leaves the offer open. With Lidia's family's wealth and his earnings from publishing, he doesn't need the money. Lidia calls the hospital and learns that Tommaso died ten minutes earlier. Overwhelmed with grief, she watches from a window as the guests enjoy themselves. Later she sits at a table opposite an empty chair. Giovanni walks over and does not sit down and Lidia does not tell him about Tommaso's death. Giovanni sees Valentina and follows after her, leaving Lidia alone. Lidia walks to the band and appears to enjoy the music. A man named Roberto (Giorgio Negro), who had been following her, approaches, asks her to dance and she accepts. A sudden shower sends the guests running for cover and some jump in the pool like children. As Lidia is about to jump in from the diving board, Roberto stops her, takes her to his car and they drive off. She enjoys Roberto's company and their conversation but as he's about to kiss her, Lidia turns away from him, saying "I'm sorry, I can't".

Back at the party, Giovanni searches through the crowd and finds Valentina alone, watching the rain. She tells him she's smart enough not to break up a marriage and instructs him to spend the rest of the evening with his wife. Giovanni reveals that he's going through a "crisis" common among writers but in his case it is affecting his whole life. They return to the guests, just as Lidia and Roberto return from their drive. Giovanni seems slightly annoyed by Lidia's behavior. Valentina invites Lidia to dry off in her room, where Lidia confronts her directly about her husband. As the women chat, Giovanni overhears his wife tell Valentina that she feels like dying and putting an end to the agony of her life. Noticing Giovanni, she tells him she is not a bit jealous of his playing around with Valentina. They say goodbye to Valentina and leave the party at morning's first light, with the jazz band playing for the few couples still listening.

As Giovanni and Lidia walk away across Gherardini's private golf course, they talk about the job offer that Giovanni says he'll turn down. Lidia finally tells him about Tommaso's death and recounts how Tommaso used to support her, have faith in her and urge her to study, believing she was intelligent, and offer his affections to her, but she eventually chose Giovanni because she loved him. She tells him, "I feel like dying because I no longer love you". Giovanni recognizes the failure of their marriage but tells her, "Let's try to hold onto something we're sure of. I love you. I'm sure I'm still in love with you". Lidia takes out a love letter Giovanni wrote to her just before they were married and reads it aloud. Giovanni asks who wrote it and she replies, "You did". Giovanni embraces and kisses her but she resists, saying she no longer loves him and nor does he love her. Giovanni continues to initiate sex in a bunker on the golf course, beneath a grey morning sky.

Cast

Censorship 
When La Notte was first released in Italy in 1960 the Committee for the Theatrical Review of the Italian Ministry of Cultural Heritage and Activities rated it as VM16: not suitable for children under 16. In addition, the committee imposed the following scenes be deleted: 1) the scene at the hospital with Mastroianni and the young lady must end at the moment when the two start to kiss each other; 2) the scene in the dressing room in which it is possible to see the naked breasts of Moreau; 3) the word "whore", said by one of the two ladies walking in the park, must be removed; 4) the final scene in which Mastroianni and Moreau hug each other and start rolling down the grass, the scene can resume when the panning shot shows the landscape without displaying the two actors. Document N° 33395 was signed on 2 November 1960 by Minister Renzo Helfer.

Production

Filming locations 
 4 Via Lanzone, Milan (the hospital)
 20 Via Gustavo Fara, Milan (Giovanni and Lidia's apartment)
 Barlassina Country Club (Gherardini villa)
 Milan, Lombardy, Italy
 Sesto San Giovanni, Milan, Lombardy, Italy

Release
La Notte grossed 470 million lire ($752,000) in Italy during its initial release in Italy.

Reception

Critical response 
In his review in The New York Times, Bosley Crowther wrote: "As in L'Avventura, it is not the situation so much as it is the intimations of personal feelings, doubts and moods that are the substance of the film". Crowther praises Antonioni's ability to develop his drama "with a skill that is excitingly fertile, subtle and awesomely intuitive".

On the review aggregator web site Rotten Tomatoes, the film holds an 86% positive rating among film critics based on 28 reviews. Stanley Kubrick listed La Notte as one of his top 10 favorite films.

Awards 
 1961 Berlin International Film Festival Golden Bear (Michelangelo Antonioni) Won
 1961 David di Donatello Award for Best Director (Michelangelo Antonioni) Won
 1962 Italian National Syndicate of Film Journalists Silver Ribbon for Best Director (Michelangelo Antonioni) Won
 1962 Italian National Syndicate of Film Journalists Silver Ribbon for Best Score (Giorgio Gaslini) Won
 1962 Italian National Syndicate of Film Journalists Silver Ribbon for Best Supporting Actress (Monica Vitti) Won
 1962 Jussi Award Diploma of Merit for Foreign Actress (Jeanne Moreau) Won

Cultural references 
 Monty Python have jokingly referred to the film, first in the subtitles of the original 1974 trailer for Monty Python and the Holy Grail, then again in 1979 at the end of Life of Brian, where the final credits ask: "If you have enjoyed this film, why not go and see La notte?"
 In the Mad Men (season 2) episode, "The New Girl",  Don Draper mentions La notte (to Bobbie Barrett) in a rare conversation about things he actually likes.
 In Spring 2013, ECM released the record La notte by Ketil Bjørnstad, which generally took its inspiration from Michelangelo Antonioni while its title and cover were taken from the film.

See also 
 List of submissions to the 34th Academy Awards for Best Foreign Language Film
 List of Italian submissions for the Academy Award for Best Foreign Language Film

Notes

References

Bibliography

External links
 
 
 
 
 La notte: Modern Love – an essay by Richard Brody at The Criterion Collection

1961 films
1961 drama films
1960s Italian-language films
Films about writers
Films directed by Michelangelo Antonioni
Films set in Milan
Films shot in Milan
Films with screenplays by Tonino Guerra
French black-and-white films
French drama films
Golden Bear winners
Italian black-and-white films
Italian drama films
1960s Italian films
1960s French films